The Helen Hayes Awards are theater awards recognizing excellence in professional theater in the Washington, D.C. area since 1983. The awards are named in tribute of Helen Hayes, who is also known as the "First Lady of American Theatre." They are presented by Theatre Washington (formerly known as the Helen Hayes Awards organization), sponsored by TodayTix, a ticketing company, and supported in part by the DC Commission on the Arts and Humanities, The Morris and Gwendolyn Cafritz Foundation, The Max and Victoria Dreyfus Foundation, The Share Fund, Prince Charitable Trust, and Craig Pascal and Victor Shargai.

History

In 1983, together with producing partner Arthur Cantor and Washington Post critic emeritus Richard L. Coe, Broadway producer Bonnie Nelson Schwartz presented a plan for strengthening and cultivating theatre in her home city, Washington, D.C., to the first lady of the American theatre and native Washingtonian, Helen Hayes, who embraced the idea. The Washington Theatre Awards Society was founded to recognize and encourage excellence in professional theatre in the Washington region through the presentation of the Helen Hayes Awards.

The organization launched education and communication programs. The early success of the Helen Hayes Awards suggested that the organization do business under the name of its most visible program. Eventually, at the input of the theatre community and a wide range of stakeholders, the organization aimed to become more robust, and adopted the name "theatreWashington" to better reflect the breadth and geographic scope of its realigned activities. In 2021 it changed its name to Theatre Washington.

Due to criticism of the "one size fits all" philosophy of the awards, in September 2013 theatreWashington announced that, effective with the 2015 awards, the awards would be split into

The Helen Group of Awards for non-Equity productions defined to be those that have no more than three equity actors or the equity actors make up less than 51% of the cast.  
The Hayes Group of Awards for productions employing too many equity actors to qualify for the Helen Group.

These awards would be at the production level, not at the company level.

Awards categories

With nearly 80 professional theatre companies, Washington, D. C., is second only to New York for the number of productions each year. During the 2011 season, 53 theatres produced 192 shows in the January 1 – December 31 judging cycle. From these shows, 153 artists, ensembles, and productions from 26 theatres were nominated for Helen Hayes Awards, which are given for resident and nonresident productions. The awards for acting, directing, design, choreography, productions, and more include:

Resident Play
Outstanding Director
Outstanding Supporting Actress
Outstanding Lead Actress
Outstanding Ensemble
Outstanding Resident Play
Resident Musical
Outstanding Director
Outstanding Supporting Actor
Outstanding Supporting Actress
Outstanding Ensemble
Outstanding Lead Actor
Outstanding Lead Actress
Outstanding Resident Musical
 Resident Production
Outstanding Set Design
Outstanding Lighting Design
Outstanding Sound Design
Outstanding Musical Direction
Outstanding Choreography
Outstanding Costume Design
 Nonresident Production
Outstanding Lead Actor
Outstanding Lead Actress
Outstanding Supporting Performer
Outstanding Nonresident Production
 Special Awards
The Charles MacArthur Award – for Outstanding New Play or Musical
The Washington Post Award – for Innovative Leadership in the Theatre Community
The John Aniello Award – for Outstanding Emerging Theatre Company
The James MacArthur Award – for Outstanding Supporting Actor, Resident Play
The Robert Prosky Award – for Outstanding Lead Actor, Resident Play
Outstanding Production – Theatre for Young Audiences

Nominee and recipient selection

 Eight judges from a judging pool, specifically endorsed for the purpose by a panel of Washington-area artistic directors, are dispatched to see each eligible production.
 Each judge evaluates each artist's work in the production on a 0-10 graded point scale in each of applicable categories. Ballots must be submitted within 24 hours of the judge's attendance.
 Judges have no idea as to the Awards status of any work they have seen and scored until the public does, i.e., when the nominees (and then the recipients) are announced.
 At the conclusion of the 12-month judging cycle (January–December), the scores from the eight judges who saw each production are tabulated by an independent analysis firm.
 In all, about 22,000 scores are analyzed annually, using standardized and widely accepted statistical models.
 The productions, designs, and performances receiving the top-five final scores in each category become the nominees. In the case of tie votes, a tie-breaking system is used, and if the tie still cannot be broken, the number of nominees is simply increased.
 Following the public announcement of the nominees, the process continues to determine the award recipient in each category. Again, in the case of tie votes, a tie-breaking system is used, and if the tie still cannot be broken, the number of recipients is increased.

Winners and nominees

1985 
1986 
1987 
1988 
1989 
1990 
1991 
1992 
1993 
1994 
1995 
1996 
1997 
1998 
1999 
2000 
2001 
2002 
2003 
2004 
2005 
2006 
2007 
2008 
2009 
2010 
2011 
2012 
2013 
2014 
2015 
2016 
2017 
2018 

Helen Hayes Awards Non-Resident Acting
Helen Hayes Awards Non-Resident Production
Helen Hayes Awards Resident Acting
Helen Hayes Awards Resident Design
Helen Hayes Awards Resident Production

See also

 Theater in Washington, DC

 John Aniello Award for Outstanding Emerging Theatre Company

References

External links
theatreWashington website

American theater awards

Culture of Washington, D.C.
Awards established in 1983
1983 establishments in Washington, D.C.